1963 in professional wrestling describes the year's events in the world of professional wrestling.

List of notable promotions 
Only two promotions held notable shows in 1963.

Calendar of notable shows

Notable events
 January 24  Capitol Wrestling Corporation (CWC) breaks away from the National Wrestling Alliance (NWA) to form the World Wide Wrestling Federation (WWWF).
 April 11 - Buddy Rogers was presented the WWWF World Heavyweight Championship at a WWWF TV taping in Washington, D.C., after being billed as the World Champion since late January.
 May 18 - Bruno Sammartino defeated Buddy Rogers in 48 seconds to win the WWWF World Heavyweight Championship in New York, NY.

Championship changes

EMLL

NWA

Debuts
Debut date uncertain:
Beauregard
Coloso Colosetti
Donna Christianello
Johnny Powers
Mr. Wrestling
Pepe Casas
Skandar Akbar
January 4  Ernie Ladd
January 10  Dory Funk Jr.
March  Rubén Soria
October 13  Great Kojika
November  Aníbal

Births
Date of birth uncertain:
 Mickie Henson (died in 2022) 
 Marie Lograsso (died in 2006) 
January 3:
Vic Grimes
New Jack (died in 2021)
January 6  Tony Halme(died in 2010) 
January 10  Firebreaker Chip
January 29  Hardcore Holly
February 22  Maxx Muscle(died in 2019) 
February 25  Doug Stahl 
February 28  Joey Marella(died in 1994) 
March 7  Bruce Prichard
March 19  Brazo de Plata (died in 2021)
March 20  Terry Simms
April 6  Neil Superior (died in 1996)  
April 18  Universo 2000 (died in 2018) 
April 22  Miguel Pérez Jr.
May 2  Big Boss Man(died in 2004) 
May 18  Gary Albright(died in 2000) 
May 19  Hollywood 
May 29  Samu
June 1  George Hines
June 4  Shigeo Miyato
June 6  Ahmed Johnson 
June 10:
Jeff Bearden 
Scott Peterson (died in 1994) 
June 12:
Jerry Lynn
Johnny Hotbody
June 16  The Sandman
June 20  Don West (died in 2022) 
June 22  John Tenta(died in 2006) 
June 24  Ángel Azteca(died in 2007) 
June 25  Bobby Blaze
July 11  Mike Enos
July 18  Al Snow
July 21:
Giant Silva
 Mark Youngblood
July 22  Steve Gillespie (died in 2020) 
July 24  Karl Malone 
July 28  Lioness Asuka
July 31  Chad Brock 
August 2  El Hijo del Santo
August 5  Pat Tanaka
August 12  Koji Kitao(died in 2019) 
August 15  Tamon Honda
August 16  Tarzan Goto(died in 2022)
August 28  Lester Speight
September 17  Masahiro Chono
September 24  Sunny Beach
September 26  Knuckles Nelson 
September 28  Steve Blackman
September 30  Mustafa Saed 
October 8  Diana Hart
October 9  Tadao Yasuda
October 11  Sam Houston
October 12  Dave Legeno (died in 2014) 
October 16  Missy Hyatt
November 11  Billy Gunn
December 1  Dave Sullivan
December 3  Steve Simpson
December 7  Bruiser Bedlam(died in 2017) 
December 8  Toshiaki Kawada
December 12  Jason Knight

Deaths
January 19  Gus Pappas 80
March 7  Billy Wolfe 66
May 10  Gene Lipscomb 31
June 2 - Century Milstead, 62
December 15  Rikidozan, 39
December 26  Gorgeous George, 48
December 27 - Wildcat Wilson, 63

References

 
professional wrestling